Wenzhou-Kean University is a Wenzhou University–Kean University joint venture university in Wenzhou, Zhejiang, China.

In March 2014, the Ministry of Education of China approved the formal establishment of Wenzhou-Kean University. The university received its accreditation to confer bachelor's degrees in 2018 and to confer professional graduate degrees in 2019.

Campus and academics
Wenzhou-Kean University (WKU), set on approximately 500 acres in the attractive mountainous region located in the south of Wenzhou, China, is one of three Sino-American cooperative universities along with NYU Shanghai and Duke Kunshan University that was approved by the Ministry of Education of China. Launched in 2012, WKU offers a unique model of higher education in partnership with Kean University, a comprehensive, public university in the state of New Jersey that is accredited by the Middle States Commission on Higher Education. WKU currently enrolls about 3,500 undergraduate students (Fall 2021), and it is now in the midst of a rapid growth that will bring enrollment to 7,000 students within the next five years. All instruction is in English, and all curriculum is provided by Kean University. Students earn degrees conferred by Kean University and Wenzhou-Kean University.

Wenzhou-Kean University currently offers 18 undergraduate programs: Finance (B.S.), Accounting (with emphasis on international standards and practices) (B.S.), Global Business (B.S.), Marketing (B.S.), Management (Business Analytics option/ Supply Chain & Information Management option) (B.S.), Economics (B.S.), Graphic Design (B.F.A.), Interior Design (B.F.A), Industrial Design (B.I.D.), Architectural Studies (B.A.), Computer Science (B.S.), Mathematical Sciences (B.A.), Biology (Cell and Molecular option) (B.S.), Chemistry (B.S.), Earth Science (Environmental Science option) (B.S.), English (English in Global Settings option) (B.A.), Psychology (General option/Forensic Psychology option) (B.A.), and Communication (Public Relations option) (B.A.). In addition, WKU has been approved by the Ministry of Education for offering 8 Master’s and 3 doctorate programs. In academic year of 2022-2023, WKU offers the following graduate programs: Doctor of Educational Leadership (Ed.D.), Biotechnology Science (M.S.), Computer Information Systems (M.S.), Instruction and Curriculum (M.A.), Global Management (M.B.A.), Architecture (M.Arch.), Educational Administration (M.A.), Psychology (M.A.). Kean courses are offered either by faculty recruited by global search or by Kean faculty visiting from the U.S. campus. The Division of Academic Affairs is led by Dr. Eric Yang, the Vice-Chancellor for Academic Affairs, since March 2018.

The campus initially comprised a General Education Hall, a Training Building, two dining halls, the student dormitory complex, and the faculty housing complex. The College of Business and Public Management Building and the Athletics Center were brought into operation in 2018. The second student dormitory complex, the Ge Hekai Building housing Architecture, Design and Computer Science programs, the Science Laboratory Building, and the Stadium have been completed in 2021. The Student Learning and Activity (Library) and WKU Administration Building will be completed in 2022, and the College of Science and Technology building is expected to be completed in 2023. The second student dormitory complex with 4,000 beds and the second faculty housing complex (400 apartment units) in the east campus will be completed in the next three years.

Finances
The construction project and all costs of operating the University will be paid for through tuition and financing provided by the municipal and provincial governments in China. There will be no cost to Kean University or the state of New Jersey.

After the fourth year of operation, between 5 percent and 10 percent of annual revenue from tuition will be invested in curriculum development, program updates and instructional innovation, according to the agreement.

English immersion program
This intensive immersion program is designed to provide a competitive advantage to gifted and talented undergraduate and graduate students who plan to enter a higher education institution where the language of instruction is English. Many international students have difficulty with English, particularly as it relates to their chosen field of study. And even when they have sufficiently mastered the language, there are still social and cultural differences to deal with. The course of study begins by focusing on both enunciation and pronunciation, followed by public speaking training using specially structured interactive exercises. There are daily short writing assignments which receive both peer and faculty feedback. Each group of about ten students regularly works with a mentor to ensure that only English is being used. Primary instruction is provided by faculty with experience and expertise in ELT. Academic credits earned are eligible for transfer to any accredited US institution or to affiliated partners. Upon completion of the program, students will be well prepared to face the challenges of academic life in whichever university they choose.

See also
Wenzhou-Kean University

References

External links
Wenzhou-Kean University
Kean University
America's Kean University Goes International
Kean University gets approval from Chinese government to build degree-granting campus

Kean University
Education in Wenzhou
Universities and colleges in Zhejiang
Educational institutions established in 2014
2014 establishments in China